Casey Larson (born 16 December 1998) is an American ski jumper. According to historian Bill Malon, he was the 100,000th Olympic male athlete to compete in the Olympic Games (across Summer and Winter Games).

Career 

In 2016, Larson participated at the Winter Youth Olympics in Lillehammer and the Junior World Championships in Rasnov.

He was one of three Chicago-area teens to make the 2018 Olympics ski jumping team, where he finished in 39th place in the normal hill individual event. He also competed at the 2022 Winter Olympics, finishing in 39th place on the normal hill and in 43rd place on the large hill.

World Cup

Standings

Individual starts

References

External links 

Casey Larson at the United States Olympic & Paralympic Committee

1998 births
Living people
American male ski jumpers
Olympic ski jumpers of the United States
Ski jumpers at the 2018 Winter Olympics
Ski jumpers at the 2022 Winter Olympics
Ski jumpers at the 2016 Winter Youth Olympics
People from Barrington, Illinois
21st-century American people